The sixth and final season of the anime series Inuyasha aired in Japan on ytv from January 26, 2004, through September 13, 2004. Based on the manga series of the same title by Rumiko Takahashi, the anime was produced by Sunrise. The season continues the half demon Inuyasha's and the high school girl Kagome Higurashi's journey alongside their friends Shippo, Miroku and Sango to obtain the fragments of the shattered Jewel of Four Souls, a powerful jewel that had been hidden inside Kagome's body, and keep the shards from being used for evil.

The anime is licensed for release in North America by Viz Media. The English dub of the last season was broadcast on Cartoon Network as part of its Adult Swim programming block from March 29, 2006, through October 27, 2006.

The ending themes were "Come" by Namie Amuro for episodes 139-147, "Change the World" by V6 for episode 148, "Brand-New World" by V6 for episodes 149-166, and "My will" by Dream for episode 167.



Episode list

Notes

References

2004 Japanese television seasons
Season 6